The athletics competition at the 1999 European Youth Summer Olympic Days was held from 11 to 14 July. The events took place in Esbjerg, Denmark. Boys and girls born 1982 or 1983 or later participated 24 track and field events, divided equally between the sexes. The programme was reduced that year, with the 1500 metres, 400 metres hurdles and discus throw events being dropped for both boys and girls. It marked the first time that girls' pole vault and 3000 metres were contested.

Medal summary

Men

Women

References

Results
1999 European Youth Olympics. World Junior Athletics History. Retrieved on 2014-11-25.
European Youth Olympics. GBR Athletics. Retrieved on 2014-11-25.

1999 European Youth Summer Olympic Days
European Youth Summer Olympic Days
1999
International athletics competitions hosted by Denmark